The Advanced Technology Regional Aircraft 90 (ATRA-90) was a propfan-powered regional aircraft that was proposed in 1986. Conceived by Industri Pesawat Terbang Nusantara (IPTN) of Indonesia, the multi-national project was also backed by Boeing of the United States, Fokker of the Netherlands, and Messerschmitt-Bölkow-Blohm (MBB) of West Germany. The ATRA-90 was targeted for introduction between 1992 and 1995, but the project was put on hold in 1988.

Design

References

Bibliography

 
 



Abandoned civil aircraft projects
Propfan-powered aircraft